Qarah Benas (also Romanized as Qarah Benās, Qareh Banās, and Qareh Benās; also known as Gareh Banās and Qaraha Bughaz) is a village in Khezel-e Gharbi Rural District, in the Central District of Kangavar County, Kermanshah Province, Iran. At the 2006 census, its population was 292, in 65 families.

References 

Populated places in Kangavar County